The Finnish Cultural and Academic Institutes (in Finnish: Suomen kulttuuri- ja tiedeinstituutit) is a group of 17 independent, non-profit organisations around the world. The institutes advance and support international mobility, visibility and collaboration of Finnish professionals in the arts, culture and research.

Goals
 Create networks and dialogue between Finnish and international cultural and academic organisations and professionals
 Organise exhibitions, seminars, courses and other events
 Collaborate actively with local organisations, partners, communities and professionals
 Run mobility and residency programmes for artists, curators and researchers
 Support the international work opportunities of Finnish arts professionals and researchers
 Conduct academic research

The institutes 
The institute network includes 17 institutes around the world
Finnish Institute at Athens (Greece)
Finnish Cultural Institute for the Benelux (Brussels), 
Finnish Institute in Germany (Berlin), 
Finnagora – Finnish Institute in Hungary (Budapest)
Finnish Cultural Institute in Denmark (Copenhagen),
Hanaholmen – Swedish-Finnish Cultural Centre (Espoo, Finland), 
The Finnish Institute in London (London)
Finnish Cultural Institute in Madrid (Madrid),
Finnish Institute in the Middle East (Beirut), 
Finnish Cultural Institute in New York (New York City), 
Finnish-Norwegian Cultural Institute (Oslo), 
Institut Finlandais (Paris), 
Institutum Romanum Finlandiae (Rome), 
Finnish Institute in Saint Peterburg (Russia), 
Finnish institute in Stockholm (Sweden), 
Finnish Institute in Estonia (Tallinn)
 Finnish Institute in Japan (Tokyo).

The Finnish Cultural and Academic Institutes (SKTI) is a Helsinki-based association that assists the institute network in communications, administration and lobbying in Finland. The institutes and SKTI are subsidised by the Ministry of Education and Culture in Finland. Their projects receive additional funding from private Finnish and foreign foundations, companies and partners.

References

External links
The Finnish Cultural and Academic Institutes (Official website)
The Finnish Institute in London
The Finnish Institute in Estonia
The Finnish Institute in Germany

Cultural promotion organizations
Finnish language
Educational institutions established in 2005
Cultural organisations based in Finland
2005 establishments in Finland